Leo Leandros (born 23 August 1926) is a Greek musician, composer and producer. Born in Astakos, Greece, Leandros left in the 1950s for Germany to pursue a career in singing and composing. He had some success, but shifted his focus to his daughter, Vicky, who had been singing from a very early age. He became her manager, composer and producer when she was 13, and is responsible for her unique training and career. Under his pseudonym Mario Panas he was the co-composer (together with Klaus Munro) of Après toi, the winning title of the 1972 Eurovision Song Contest, which Vicky performed for Luxembourg.

Leandros composed and produced for many other artists such as Julio Iglesias, Demis Roussos, Nana Mouskouri, Ulli Martin, Freddy Quinn and Jairo, among others. His compositions are very lyrical with interesting arrangements. He has composed some of the most beautiful melodies of Western popular repertoire, combining Greek sound with a European one. In 1983, he retired but returned exclusively to the studio in the early 1990s for 3 albums with Vicky Leandros. His albums have sold over 120 million worldwide. A low-profile personality, Leandros avoids public appearances. In October 2005 though he appeared on German/Austrian TV as a surprise guest for his daughter who was celebrating her 30-year stage Jubilee. 

He was also the first singer of the Hymn of Panathinaikos.

Discography

References

External links
Official Homepage
Leo Leandros at IMDb

1926 births
Living people
Greek songwriters
Eurovision Song Contest winners
People from Astakos